Southern Railway Company v. United States, 222 U.S. 20 (1911), was a decision by the United States Supreme Court which held that under the Commerce Clause, the U.S. Congress can regulate safety on intrastate rail traffic because there is a close and substantial connection to interstate traffic.

Background
Congress required all train cars to be equipped with couplers as a safety measure. Southern Railway argued that the requirement applied only to train cars crossing state lines, not to train cars that operated inside one state.

The Safety Appliance Act of March 2, 1893, 27 Stat. 531, c. 196:
...imposed upon every carrier "engaged in interstate commerce by railroad" the duty of equipping all trains, locomotives, and cars used on its line of railroad in moving interstate traffic, with designated appliances calculated to promote the safety of that traffic...

Decision
The Commerce Clause is plenary to protect persons and property moving in interstate commerce from all danger. No matter the source or destination, Congress may require all vehicles moving on lanes of interstate commerce to be so equipped with safety devices to avoid danger to persons and property in interstate commerce.

See also
Henderson v. United States
List of United States Supreme Court cases, volume 222

References

External links
 

United States Constitution Article One case law
United States Commerce Clause case law
United States Supreme Court cases
1911 in United States case law
Southern Railway (U.S.)
Railway litigation in 1911
United States Supreme Court cases of the White Court
Couplers
Railway safety